Frank Carr may refer to:
 Frank Carr (equestrian) (1893–1981), American Olympic equestrian
 Frank Carr (footballer) (1919–2010), English professional footballer
 Frank Carr (politician), member of the California State Legislature from 1917 to 1925
 Frank George Griffith Carr (1903–1991), director of the National Maritime Museum, Greenwich, England
 Frank Osmond Carr (1858–1915), composer
 Franklin Carr (soldier) (1844–1904), recipient of the Medal of Honor during the American Civil War

See also
 Francis Carr (disambiguation)